Takejirō, Takejiro or Takejirou (written: 竹二郎 or 武次郎) is a masculine Japanese given name. Notable people with the name include:

 (1853–1938), Japanese publisher
 (1867–1935), Japanese politician

Japanese masculine given names